James Stuart Bynum (born October 17, 1962) is a retired United States Navy rear admiral who served as the Assistant Deputy Chief of Naval Operations for Warfighting Development and Director of Warfare Integration from May 4, 2020, to May 29, 2021. Previously, he served as the Director of Assessment from 2018 to 2020.

Born and raised in Waco, Texas, Bynum graduated from the University of Oklahoma with a Bachelor of Arts degree in database management in 1985. He was designated a naval aviator in December 1986.

Bynum is the son of James Arthur Bynum and Lynda Vernon (Massey) Bynum.

References

|-

William D. Byrne Jr.

1962 births
Living people
People from Waco, Texas
University of Oklahoma alumni
United States Naval Aviators
Recipients of the Legion of Merit
United States Navy admirals
Military personnel from Texas